The Tipperary Premier Intermediate Hurling Championship, formerly Séamus Ó Riain Cup, (known for sponsorship reasons as the FBD Insurance Tipperary Premier Intermediate Hurling Championship) is an annual hurling competition organised by the Tipperary County Board of the Gaelic Athletic Association since 2017 for the second tier hurling teams in the county of Tipperary in Ireland.

The series of games are played during the spring, summer and autumn months with the cup final currently being played at Semple Stadium in October. It is sometimes played as the curtain-raiser to the senior final. The prize for the winning team is the Séamus Ó Riain Cup. The cup begins with a group stage and is followed by a knock-out stage.

Roscrea are the title-holders after defeating Gortnahoe-Glengoole by 1-17 to 0-16 in the 2022 cup final.

History

The Séamus Ó Riain Cup was created in 2017 in an effort to reduce the number of teams in the Tipperary Senior Hurling Championship. The cup was created for Roinn II teams. The Séamus Ó Riain Cup has been described as a senior hurling 'B' grade, though without the off-putting 'B' letter being used.  From the 2022 Championship, the competition was renamed the Tipperary Premier Intermediate Hurling Championship following a vote at the Tipperary County Board. The winners will then go on to represent Tipperary in the All-Ireland Intermediate Club Hurling Championship.

Format

Group stage

For the group stage there are four groups of four teams. The teams are ranked based on their performance the previous year. 

Teams will play the other three teams in the group once and match points will be awarded depending on the result of each game, with teams receiving two points for a win, and one for a draw.

Following the completion of the group stage, the four group winners, and the four group runners-up qualify for the knock-out stage.

Knock-out stage

The four group winners are seeded and play a runner-up not from their group. Teams in the same group are kept apart until the final, if they make it that far.

Sponsorship

Since 2017 the Séamus Ó Riain Cup has been sponsored by Tipperary Water.

Trophy

The winning team is presented with the Séamus Ó Riain Cup. A national school teacher by profession, Séamus Ó Riain (1916-2007) began his career in the administrative affairs of the Gaelic Athletic Association when he was elected secretary of the Moneygall club before later representing the club on the North Tipperary Board. In 1955 he was elected vice-chairman of the board before serving as chairman between 1957 and 1966. Ó Riain's growing expertise as an administrator was further rewarded in 1958 when he was elected as one of top Tipperary delegates on the Munster Council. In 1962 he was elected vice-chairman of the provincial council before taking over as chairman in 1965. Ó Riain served as the 22nd President of the Gaelic Athletic Association from 1967 until 1970.

List of finals

References

1